The 1986–87 DFB-Pokal was the 44th season of the annual German football cup competition. It began on 27 August 1986 and ended on 20 June 1987. 64 teams competed in the tournament of six rounds. In the final Hamburger SV defeated Stuttgarter Kickers 3–1.

Matches

First round

Replays

Second round

Replays

Round of 16

Quarter-finals

Semi-finals

Final

References

External links
 Official site of the DFB 
 Kicker.de 

1986-87
1986–87 in German football cups